Brigges is a surname. Notable people with the surname include:

Brigges Baronets
Humphrey Brigges (disambiguation), multiple people

See also
Briggs (surname)